Micky Yanai (b. 1959) is a well-known Japanese male porn actor.

Life and career
Yanai is supposedly the inventor of an acrobatic sexual technique called the "Helicopter Fuck", although it is said such a technique was already seen in the Kama Sutra, or at least in the Cosmopolitan magazine version of it.  He demonstrated his proficiency at the technique with a series of videos for the KMP Million label in 2004. (See Filmography)

Yanai has become one of the few Japanese male porn stars known in the West through a group of videos produced by V&R Planning and released internationally in the United States and elsewhere in 2003 and 2004 by V&R International in uncensored form: Paradise of Japan 14: Helicopter Man (with Misuzu Akimoto), Paradise of Japan 22: Helicopterman 2, and Paradise of Japan 28: Helicopterman 3.

Partial filmography

References

Sources
 
 
 

Japanese male pornographic film actors
Living people
1959 births